Jarvis Pass is a mountain pass in Kakwa Provincial Park in the Northern Rockies of British Columbia, Canada, located to the north of Kakwa Lake, on the British Columbia-Alberta boundary, and therefore is on the Continental Divide.  It was one of the many passes surveyed as a route for the Canadian Pacific Railway in the 1870s.

History
On December 9, 1874, explorer E.W. Jarvis and Major C.F. Hanington of Ottawa began an expedition across the Rockies, beginning at Quesnel, with the purpose of determining if the route they traveled could be used by the Canadian Pacific Railway (CPR). In February 1875, Jarvis discovered the pass. Jarvis and Hanington completed their  journey on May 21, 1875 in Winnipeg. The name of the pass, chosen in E.W. Jarvis' honor, was officially adopted by the Geographical Board on March 31, 1917 and confirmed in December 15, 1982. The mountains to either side of the pass are named Jarvis and Mount Hanington.

References

Mountain passes of British Columbia
Canadian Rockies
Northern Interior of British Columbia
Great Divide of North America